Masallı is a city in and the capital of the Masally District of Azerbaijan.

History 
Masally city was established in 1960. The name of the city comes from the name of a tribe – “Masal” that lived in the territory of Masally in ancient times.

Population 
According to the statistics of 2009, the total number of Masally city was 8867, of which 4469 (50.4%) were men and 4398 (49.6%) were women.

Territory 

By the decree of the president on “Changes to administrative units of Masally District” dated on 15 March 2013, Gigah, Dadva, Seybatin, Isgandarli villages of Masally city were removed from the State register of territorial units of Azerbaijan.

Historical monuments 
There are approximately 208 historical, archeological, and architectural monuments in Masally.

Court 
Masally District's Court is situated in Masally city. The initial name of the court was Masally District People's Court.

References

External links 

Populated places in Masally District